Synchytriaceae is a chytrid fungus family in the division Chytridiomycota. The family was described by German mycologist Joseph Schröter in 1892. The type genus, Synchytrium, contains about 200 species of fungi that are parasitic on flowering plants, ferns, mosses, and algae. Synchytrium endobioticum causes potato wart disease, an economically important disease of cultivated potato.

References

External links

Chytridiomycota
Fungus families
Taxa named by Joseph Schröter
Taxa described in 1892